Alexei Mikhailovich Bezgodov (born 30 June 1969) is a Russian chess grandmaster and writer.

Chess career
Bezgodov won the 1993 Russian Chess Championship. He finished second in the 1995 Chigorin Memorial. He gained the Grandmaster title in 1999, and the same year he was the joint winner of the 1999 Ukrainian Chess Championship. (He did not obtain the title of Chess Champion of Ukraine, since he was Russian.) In December that year, he finished second in the Russian Chess Championship, after losing to Konstantin Sakaev 3–1 in the final.

Bezgodov played on the second board of the team Russia "D" in the 39th Chess Olympiad (2010), scoring 7/10 (+5−1=4). In the Chess World Cup 2011, Bezgodov was eliminated in the first round by Nikita Vitiugov, who beat him 4–2. Bezgodov qualified as one of the four nominees of the local Organising Committee.

Books
Challenging the Sicilian with 2.a3!?. Chess Stars, Sofia. 2004. .
The Extreme Caro–Kann: Attacking Black with 3.f3. New In Chess. 2014. .
The Art of the Tarrasch Defence: Strategies, Techniques and Surprising Ideas. New In Chess. 2017. 
Defend Like Petrosian: What You Can Learn From TIgran Petrosian's Extraordinary Defensive Skills. New In Chess. 2020.

References

External links

1969 births
Living people
Chess grandmasters
Chess Olympiad competitors
Russian chess players
Russian chess writers